Hurricane Season is a 2009 American sports drama film directed by Tim Story and starring Forest Whitaker, Taraji P. Henson, Isaiah Washington, Lil Wayne, and Bow Wow. The screenplay was written by Robert Eisele and the film was produced by Raymond Brothers and Scott Glassgold. The film had been delayed several times and was sent straight to DVD on December 8, 2009.

Plot

This movie is based on the true story of John Ehret High School's 2005–06 State championship team. After Hurricane Katrina, Al Collins (Forest Whitaker), a John Ehret high school basketball coach in Jefferson Parish, across the river from New Orleans in Marrero, Louisiana, assembles a team of players who had previously attended five different schools before Hurricane Katrina and leads them on the path to winning the state championship and rebuilding the community.

Cast
Forest Whitaker as Al Collins
Jackie Long as JJ Coleman
Taraji P. Henson as Dayna Collins
China Anne McClain as Alana Collins
Isaiah Washington as Coach Buddy Simmons
Bonnie Hunt as Principal Durant
Bow Wow as Gary Davisee
Khleo Thomas as David Willis
Robbie Jones as Brian Randolph
Lil Wayne as Lamont Johnson
Michael Gaston as Coach Frank Landon
Courtney B. Vance as Mr. Randolph
Irma P. Hall as Grandma Rose
Marcus Lyle Brown as Spencer's Father
Brian Hartley as Fan
Laurie Lee as Fan 
J. B. Smoove as Sam, the Bus-driver
Eric D. Hill as Christian Wall
Jarod Einsohn as Randy Verdin
Nick Washington as Nicholas Washington

Music
The score for the film was composed by Mark Mancina. The theme song, "Be On Our Way" by Van Hunt feat. Supervision, Buku Wise, and Hidden Faces was written and produced by Frank Fitzpatrick. There was no official soundtrack release for the film, however proceeds from the "Be On Our Way" sales were donated to aid victims of the Hurricane Katrina disaster.

References

External links

American basketball films
American sports drama films
Films directed by Tim Story
Films set in New Orleans
Films shot in New Orleans
Films about Hurricane Katrina
The Weinstein Company films
2000s sports drama films
Films scored by Mark Mancina
Dimension Films films
2009 drama films
2009 films
2000s English-language films
2000s American films
English-language sports drama films